Kim Kyeong-Min (born 1 November 1991) is a South Korean footballer who plays as a goalkeeper for Gwangju FC.

Career
Kim made several appearances for the South Korea U-20 and U-23 teams between 2009 and 2012. He made his professional club debut for Jeju United in a 1-0 victory over Ulsan Hyundai on 16 August 2014. He joined Busan IPark on loan on 18 January 2017.

In 2021, season, he joined Seoul E-Land FC was nominated as a vice captain.

In 2022, he was traded with Yoon Bo-sang and moved to Gwangju FC.

Club career statistics
As of 9 January 2022

References

External links 
 

1991 births
Living people
Association football midfielders
South Korean footballers
Busan IPark players
Korea National League players
K League 1 players